"Ain't No Saint" is a song by Swedish singer and television personality Peg Parnevik. The song was released as a digital download on 14 March 2016, and was written by Parnevik along with Erik Lewander and Josefin Glenmark, while Lewander produced the song as well. The song has since peaked at number 2 on Sverigetopplistan.

Track listing

Chart performance

Weekly charts

Release history

References

2016 songs
2016 debut singles
Swedish pop songs
Sony Music singles
Peg Parnevik songs
English-language Swedish songs
Songs written by Erik Lewander
Songs written by Peg Parnevik